The Bombardier Electrostar (sold as the ADtranz Electrostar until 2001) is a family of electric multiple-unit (EMU) passenger trains manufactured by Bombardier Transportation (formerly Adtranz) at their Derby Litchurch Lane Works in England between 1999 and 2017. It has become the most common new EMU type in the United Kingdom since the privatisation of British Rail with a number of variants. Electrostar trains are most common on high-volume suburban commuter routes around London; and on mainline services from London south to Surrey and the south coast, east to Essex, and north to Cambridge and Stansted Airport.

The model shares the same bodyshell and core structure as the Bombardier Turbostar which is the most common post-privatisation diesel multiple unit (DMU) family; both evolved from the Class 168 Clubman design by ADtranz. The Turbostar and Electrostar platforms are a modular design, sharing the same basic bodyshell and core structure, and optimised for speedy manufacture and easy maintenance. A common underframe, created by seam-welding a number of aluminium alloy extrusions, is covered by body panels and topped by a single piece roof, again made from extruded sections. Car ends (cabs) are made from glass-reinforced plastic and steel, and are bolted onto the main car bodies. Underframe components are collected in "rafts" which are bolted into slots on the underframe. The predominantly aluminium-alloy body gives light weight to help acceleration and energy efficiency.

The Electrostar was selected for use on the Gautrain system in South Africa, a new railway between Johannesburg, Pretoria, and the Johannesburg International Airport. The trains were assembled by UCW Partnership in South Africa from components made in Derby.

Transport for London (TfL) announced in August 2006 that it had ordered 48 three- and four-car  Electrostar trains for the new London Overground service. These were categorised by Network Rail as Class 378, and entered service in 2009 to replace the Class 313 and Class 508 trains on the North London Line and West London Line, and to provide the opening service on the new East London line extension in 2010.

In 2009, as part of the government's wider rolling stock plan, an order was placed for thirty four-car Class 379 Electrostar units intended for use by National Express East Anglia (now operated by Greater Anglia) on the Stansted Express and West Anglia services. The first of these units entered passenger service on Thursday 3 March 2011.

Production of the trains ended in 2017 when unit number 387174 for Great Western Railway was completed at Derby. The family was superseded by the Bombardier Aventra.

Electrostar variants

Bombardier Electrostar routes

c2c

c2c uses Class 357 on services down the London, Tilbury and Southend line from Shoeburyness and Southend to London Fenchurch Street.

Southeastern

The Class 375 is the backbone of Southeastern's long-distance routes, seeing services on most of its lines originating from its London termini (London Victoria, Charing Cross, Cannon Street and London Bridge) including;
Chatham Main Line
Maidstone East Line
Medway Valley Line
South Eastern Main Line
Hastings Line
Ashford to Ramsgate (via Canterbury West) line
Kent Coast Line
North Kent Line
Mid Kent Line

On the outer suburban portions of these above routes, the Class 377/5 Electrostars and the Class 465/9 Networkers support the Class 375 Electrostars, but they do not work in multiple together.

The Class 376 operates on the metro routes in suburban London, in conjunction with the Class 707 Desiro Cities, Class 465 and Class 466 Networkers, operating over the London portion of the above lines from the London Termini (including Blackfriars) out to Dartford and Sevenoaks);

North Kent Line (to Gravesend)
Bexleyheath Line (to Dartford)
Dartford Loop Line (to Dartford)
South Eastern Main Line (to Sevenoaks)
Hayes Line

This leaves the Bromley North Line, operated by Class 465s (4 car Networkers). The Bromley North Line, Sheerness Line and Medway Valley Line used to be operated exclusively by the Class 466s (2 car Networkers) prior to the introduction of accessibility regulations in January 2020.

Southern

Southern's Class 377 fleet is found on all parts of the network apart from the non-electrified routes. They frequent metro routes, formerly alongside the Class 455s, until the latter's withdrawal in 2022, and Class 456s until they transferred to South West Trains in 2014.

Main lines
Brighton Main Line (Victoria–Gatwick and Brighton)
East Coastway (Brighton–Eastbourne, Hastings and Ore)
West Coastway (Brighton–Portsmouth and Southampton)
Arun Valley Line (Victoria–Horsham, Littlehampton and Chichester)
West London Line (Clapham Junction–Watford Junction) (Using Class 377/2 or Dual Voltage Class 377/7)

Outer suburban
London Victoria–Horsham via Dorking
London Victoria–East Grinstead
London Bridge–Horsham via East Croydon
London Victoria-Reigate
Redhill-Tonbridge

Suburban
Often found on
London Victoria–Dorking via Sutton
London Victoria–Epsom Downs
London Bridge-London Victoria via Sydenham
London Bridge-Caterham
London Victoria-Caterham
London Victoria-Epsom
London Bridge-Tattenham Corner

London Overground

London Overground operates Class 378s over four lines of its six around London:
North London Line (Richmond–Stratford via Willesden Junction)
West London Line (Clapham Junction–Willesden Junction via West Brompton, and continuing on the North London Line to Stratford)
East London Line (Crystal Palace, New Cross or West Croydon–Dalston Junction and Highbury & Islington via Canada Water)
South London Line  (Clapham Junction–Peckham Rye, and continuing on the East London Line to Dalston Junction)

Gautrain (South Africa)
On 8 June 2010, the route between Sandton and OR Tambo International Airport in South Africa opened in time for the 2010 FIFA World Cup. The rest between Johannesburg Park Station and Rosebank was to be completed in 2011. This section was actually opened 7 June 2012, the delay caused by work to resolve a water-seepage problem in the single-track tunnel section between Rosebank and Park. According to the Gautrain planning and implementation study, this is done for several reasons, including that standard gauge is safer and more comfortable to passengers. The rolling stock is also easier, quicker and less expensive to obtain than Cape Gauge rolling stock, and standard gauge is also less expensive to maintain as it is more tolerant of track imperfections than Cape Gauge.

Great Western Railway

From September 2016 Great Western Railway introduced 45 4 car Class 387/1s on peak services between London Paddington and Hayes & Harlington. They currently replace the Class 165s and the Class 166s on the Thames Valley services and now operate between London Paddington and Reading, Didcot Parkway and Newbury. 

GWR announced in 2018 that they will modify 12 units to be used on Heathrow Express due to the Class 332s no longer having a depot.

In December 2019, some services to Reading transferred to TfL Rail as part of the Elizabeth line.

Great Northern
From late 2016, 29 of the Class 387/1s operating on Thameslink were displaced by the delivery of Class 700 Desiro City units, and were transferred to Great Northern. They operate mostly on the Kings Cross-Cambridge-King's Lynn route, though they can also been seen on other services. These units were delivered in the livery of Southern, with green doors and Southern upholstery.

See also
Bombardier Turbostar

References

External links 

Bombardier Transportation multiple units
Adtranz multiple units
British Rail electric multiple units
Train-related introductions in 2000
Electric multiple units of South Africa